Peter Cartwright (born 23 August 1957) was an English footballer who made 119 appearances in the Football League playing as a midfielder for Newcastle United, Scunthorpe United and Darlington. He also played non-league football for clubs including North Shields and Blyth Spartans.
Peter now works as a GCSE and A-Level Mathematics Teacher at Astley Community High School, Seaton Deleval, Northumberland.

References

1957 births
Living people
Footballers from Newcastle upon Tyne
English footballers
Association football midfielders
North Shields F.C. players
Newcastle United F.C. players
Scunthorpe United F.C. players
Darlington F.C. players
Blyth Spartans A.F.C. players
English Football League players